Potoli is a village in Belgaum district of Karnataka, India.

Population
At the 2011 census the population was 91, with 44 males and 47 females, 12 children under six and a literacy rate of 70.89%.

References

Villages in Belagavi district